Broadcast Film Critics Association Awards 1996 may refer to:

 1st Critics' Choice Awards, the first Critics' Choice Awards ceremony that took place in 1996
 2nd Critics' Choice Awards, the second Critics' Choice Awards ceremony that took place in 1997 and which honored the best in film for 1996